Elze may refer to:

Places
Elze, Lower Saxony, Germany
Elze, district of Wedemark, Hanover, Germany
Elze, name for that portion of the Alzette river through Goethe, Germany
A district of Malons-et-Elze, France

People
Elze or Eltze is a German surname:
 Karl Elze (1821-1889), German scholar and Shakespearean critic

Transportation
Elze–Bodenburg railway
Elze–Löhne railway

See also
 Elz (disambiguation)
 Eltz (disambiguation)